Allium cyaneum, dark blue garlic, is a Chinese (天蓝韭, tian lan jiu, meaning "sky blue chive") species of onion. It occurs in Gansu, Hubei, Ningxia, Qinghai, Shaanxi, Sichuan and Xizang (Tibet) provinces of China, and possibly in Korea. Its leaves and scapes are edible and are occasionally consumed by local peoples as a spice after drying. It has gained the Royal Horticultural Society's Award of Garden Merit, and is also considered by them as a good plant to attract pollinators.

Description
Allium cyaneum has cylindrical bulbs that grow in clusters. It spreads by rhizomes. The flowers, as scientific and common names suggest, are blue. It flowers and fruits from August to October.

References

cyaneum
Onions
Flora of Ningxia
Flora of Qinghai
Flora of North-Central China
Flora of South-Central China
Flora of Tibet
Plants described in 1875